The Palmetto League was a Class D level baseball minor league that played in 1931. The four–team Palmetto league had teams based in South Carolina and Georgia. The Palmetto League permanently folded midway through the 1931 season with the Augusta Wolves in 1st place.

History
The Palmetto League formed for the 1931 season as a Class D level minor league. Under the direction of league president Charles H. Garrison, the Palmetto League began play as a four–team league, hosting franchises from Anderson, South Carolina (Anderson Electrics), Augusta, Georgia (Augusta Wolves), Florence, South Carolina (Florence Pee Deans) and Greenville, South Carolina (Greenville Spinners). The Palmetto League played a split–season. After the first half of the season was completed, the Anderson Electricians moved to Spartanburg, South Carolina and played as the Spartanburg Spartans.

The Palmetto League's first season of play began on Monday, April 27, 1931. After the season began, Anderson (14–40) moved to Spartanburg on June 29, 1931, playing their first home game in Spartanburg on July 2, 1931. The Augusta Wolves won the 1st half of the season.

On July 23, 1931, the Palmetto League folded with Augusta in 1st place of the second half standings. The Augusta Wolves led the final overall Palmetto League standings with a 53–23 record, 9.0 games ahead of the 2nd place Florence Pee Deans (44–32), followed by the Greenville Spinners (37–39) and the Anderson Electrics/Spartanburg Spartans (28–58) who finished 30.0 games behind. Notably, Bill McGhee of Augusta hit .405 for the season, to lead the league.

When the Palmetto League permanently folded on July 23, 1931, the league cited "financial difficulties" as the contributing factor.

Palmetto League teams

Standings and statistics

Anderson (14–10) moved to Spartanburg on June 29, 1931. First home game July 2, 1931.

References

Defunct minor baseball leagues in the United States
Baseball leagues in South Carolina
Defunct professional sports leagues in the United States
Baseball leagues in Georgia (U.S. state)
Sports leagues established in 1931
Sports leagues disestablished in 1931